The 1928 United States Senate election in Nebraska took place on November 6, 1928. The incumbent Republican, Robert B. Howell, was re-elected by a wide margin to a second term. He defeated Richard Lee Metcalfe. Howell underperformed Herbert Hoover, who won the state with 63.19% in the presidential election.

Democratic primary

Candidates
Richard Lee Metcalfe, former governor of the Panama Canal Zone
E. E. Placek, former State Senator

Results

Republican primary

Candidates
Robert B. Howell, the incumbent Senator
Ora S. Spillman, Nebraska Attorney General

Results

Results

References 

1928
Nebraska
United States Senate